This Heat is the debut studio album by English experimental rock band This Heat. Recorded between 1976 and 1978, it was released in September 1979 by record label Piano.

Reception 

In a contemporary review for NME, Andy Gill wrote: "For much of This Heat's album, it's difficult and at times impossible to decipher which instrument is playing what. This is some indication of their intentions, and the way This Heat set about realising those intentions." Vivien Goldman, writing in Melody Maker, remarked that This Heat "takes you to ten movies in the space of a one-year-old album". NME listed it as the 35th best album of 1979.

Legacy 
Retrospectively, Dean McFarlane of AllMusic wrote: "There are very few records that can be considered truly important, landmark works of art that produce blueprints for an entire genre. In the case of this album, it's clear that this seminal work was integral in shaping the genres of post-punk, avant rock and post-rock, and like all great influential albums, it seemed it had to wait two decades before its contents could truly be fathomed." Peter Marsh of BBC Music called it "one of the strongest and strangest debut records of all time. Seemingly born out of the fervent experimentalism of the UK post-punk scene, This Heats beautifully skewed mix of improvisation, lo-fi tapework and stretched, ghostly songform actually had more in common with maverick longhairs like Henry Cow and Faust. [...] The music here seethes with an economy, invention and power that still shocks a quarter of a century on." Steven Grant of Trouser Press wrote: "Though insolent and withdrawn, the music is adventurous and, in its own peculiar way, engrossing."

Pitchfork included the song "24 Track Loop" on their list of the "Greatest 500 Songs from Punk to the Present".

Track listing 
All tracks composed by This Heat
 "Testcard" – 0:47
 "Horizontal Hold" – 6:56
 "Not Waving" – 7:26
 "Water" – 3:10
 "Twilight Furniture" – 5:06
 "24 Track Loop" – 5:57
 "Diet of Worms" – 3:09
 "Music Like Escaping Gas" – 3:40
 "Rainforest" – 2:55
 "The Fall of Saigon" – 5:10
 "Testcard" – 4:09

Personnel 
This Heat
 Charles Bullen – vocals, guitar, clarinet, drums, tapes
 Charles Hayward – vocals, drums, keyboards, guitar, bass guitar, tapes
 Gareth Williams – vocals, bass guitar, keyboards, tapes
Technical
 This Heat – production, engineering
 Chris Blake – engineering
 Frank Bryan – engineering
 David Cunningham – production, engineering
 Kevin Harrison – engineering
 Anthony Moore – production
 Rik Walton – engineering

References

External links 

 

This Heat albums
1979 debut albums